Mirza Bakurovich Alborov (born 17 December 1987) is a Russian former professional footballer.

Club career
He made his debut in the Russian Premier League in 2005 for FC Alania Vladikavkaz.

External links
 

1987 births
Sportspeople from Vladikavkaz
Living people
Russian footballers
Association football midfielders
FC Spartak Vladikavkaz players
Russian expatriate footballers
FK Mornar players
Expatriate footballers in Montenegro
Russian Premier League players
FC Salyut Belgorod players
FC Dynamo Bryansk players
FC Znamya Truda Orekhovo-Zuyevo players
FC Avangard Kursk players
FC Neftekhimik Nizhnekamsk players
FC Spartak-UGP Anapa players